Burkburnett Independent School District is a public school district based in Burkburnett, Texas, United States.

The district is located in northeastern Wichita County and also serves Cashion Community and a small section of Wichita Falls. A small portion of western Clay County lies within the district.

In 2009, the school district was rated "academically acceptable" by the Texas Education Agency.

Schools

High school
Grades 9-12
Burkburnett High School

Middle school
Grades 6-8 
Burkburnett Middle School

Elementary schools
Prekindergarten - grade 5
Evans Elementary School
Overton Ray Elementary School
John G. Tower Elementary School

References

External links
Burkburnett ISD

School districts in Wichita County, Texas
School districts in Clay County, Texas
Education in Wichita Falls, Texas